The Lower Grindelwald Glacier is a Glacier in the Swiss Bernese Alps, situated to the south-east of Grindelwald. It starts below the Agassizhorn and the Strahlegghörner and is connected with the Finsteraar Glacier via the Finsteraarjoch.

The Lower Grindelwald Glacier yet has a major tributary, the Ischmeer (Swiss German for Ice Sea, formerly known as Grindelwald-Fiescher Glacier), which is the glacier overlooked by the Jungfrau Railway's Eismeer railway station.

The glacier has significantly shrunk since, having a length of just  in 2015, with most of the retreat happening since 2007.

Around 2000 it still reached into the gorge between the Hörnli (Eiger) and Mättenberg.

The Lower Grindelwald Glacier should not be confused with the Upper Grindelwald Glacier, situated to its north-east. The Grindelwald-Fiescher Glacier should not be confused with the like-named Fiescher Glacier, to the south of the Fiescherhorn.

See also
List of glaciers in Switzerland
List of glaciers
Retreat of glaciers since 1850
Swiss Alps

References

External links
 Swiss glacier monitoring network

Glaciers of the canton of Bern
Glaciers of the Alps
Grindelwald
GLowerGrindelwald